Magnolia Park is a  park in the Magnolia neighborhood of Seattle, Washington.

According to the Seattle Parks and Recreation Department:

References

External links
Official site, Seattle Department of Parks and Recreation

Parks in Seattle
Magnolia, Seattle